Artem Shamatryn (born 15 June 1991) is a Ukrainian athlete specialising in the high hurdles. He represented his country at the 2016 World Indoor Championships without advancing from the heats.

His personal bests are 13.80 seconds in the 110 metres hurdles (+0.5 m/s, Lutsk 2018) and 7.70 seconds in the 60 metres hurdles (Kiev 2016).

International competitions

References

1991 births
Living people
Sportspeople from Dnipro
Ukrainian male hurdlers
Ukrainian Athletics Championships winners
Athletes (track and field) at the 2019 European Games
European Games medalists in athletics
European Games gold medalists for Ukraine
20th-century Ukrainian people
21st-century Ukrainian people